Monkey apple is a common name for several plants and may refer to:

Annona glabra,  a tropical fruit tree
Syzygium smithii, an Australian tree, also naturalised in New Zealand 
 Fruit of Posoqueria latifolia
Licania platypus, a tree species native to Central America